Hottingen is a quarter in District 7 in Zürich.
It was formerly a municipality of its own, but was incorporated into Zürich in 1893.

Hottingen is located on the southern side of the Adlisberg. The upper part of Hottingen is called Dolder and is a residential quarter of Zürich.

Points of interests include, besides Adlisberg, the Villa Tobler, its park and the Theater an der Winkelwiese.

References

District 7 of Zürich
Former municipalities of the canton of Zürich